William Andrew MacKay  (March 20, 1929 –  January 12, 2013) was a Canadian lawyer and former judge, civil servant, legal academic, and university president.

Education and early career
Born in Halifax, Nova Scotia, the son of Robert Alexander MacKay and Mary Kathleen Junkin, MacKay received a Bachelor of Arts degree in 1950, a Bachelor of Law degree in 1953, and a Master of Law degree in 1954 from Dalhousie University. He was called to the Nova Scotia Bar in 1954 and was created a Queen's Counsel in 1973.

He joined the Department of External Affairs in 1954 where he worked as a Foreign Services Officer. From 1955 to 1957, he was an Assistant Secretary of the Royal Commission on Canada's Economic Prospects.

Academic career
In 1957, he became an assistant professor at Dalhousie University. He was an associate professor from 1959 to 1961 and was made a professor in 1961. From 1960 to 1961, he received a Ford Foundation Fellowship to study at Harvard University. In 1963, he became the George Munro Professor of Law. From 1964 to 1969, he was the dean of the Faculty of Law and the Weldon Professor of Law. From 1969 to 1988, he was professor. From 1969 to 1980, he was a vice-president at Dalhousie University. From 1980 to 1986, he was the eighth president and vice-chancellor.

Judicial career
From 1967 to 1986, he chaired the Nova Scotia Human Rights Commission. In 1988, he was appointed Justice of the Federal Court of Canada (Trial Division). He retired in 2004. From 2004 to 2007, he was as a Deputy Judge of the Federal Court. In 2008, he was appointed an ad hoc Information Commissioner.

Death
Local newspapers reported that Dr. Mackay died suddenly on January 12, 2013.

References

1929 births
2013 deaths
20th-century Canadian civil servants
Canadian legal scholars
Canadian university and college chief executives
Canadian university and college faculty deans
Canadian university and college vice-presidents
Dalhousie University alumni
Academic staff of the Dalhousie University
Harvard University alumni
Judges in Nova Scotia
Lawyers in Nova Scotia
People from Halifax, Nova Scotia
Canadian King's Counsel